Miranda Lichtenstein (born December 11, 1969) is an American artist focusing on photography and video.

Life
Lichtenstein was born in New York City and she currently lives and works in New York. From ages 3–15, she lived in Brookline, Massachusetts. At age 15 she moved to Williamstown, Massachusetts to attend Buxton School. She lived in Prague for part 1991 of and in Japan in 2009.

In 1990, Lichtenstein graduated with a BA from Sarah Lawrence College in Bronxville, NY. In 1993 she earned her MFA from California Institute of the Arts, Valencia, CA.

Work
Miranda Lichtenstein uses the medium of photography akin to 19th-century Romanticism. Her work is often described as painterly. Influenced by German conceptualist photographers Bernd and Hilla Beecher, she questions the "unknown".

Richard Conway, in Time wrote "Polaroids may seem to be simply vibrant studies of flowers. But look a little closer, and they get just a little less bright – and even more interesting.", Interview has found her work "so mesmerizing that it's almost easy to miss out on their intellectual underpinnings.", and Art in America magazine has described it as "handsome to look at but difficult to interpret".

Exhibition history
Selected solo exhibitions include The Whitney Museum at Phillip Morris, New York (2001), Hammer Museum, Los Angeles (2006), Austin Museum of Art-Arthouse(2012), Elizabeth Dee Gallery, New York (2003, 2005, 2007, 2010) and Mary Goldman Gallery, Los Angeles (2003 & 2006).

Lichtenstein’s work is held in the collections of The Hirshhorn Museum, Washington, DC, Madison Museum of Contemporary Art, Wisconsin, New Museum of Contemporary Art, New York, Solomon R. Guggenheim Museum, New York, Henry Art Museum, Seattle WA, and Neuberger Museum, Purchase, NY.

Collections
Miranda Lichtenstein’s work is held in the collections of The Hirshhorn Museum, Washington, DC, Madison Museum of Contemporary Art, Wisconsin, New Museum of Contemporary Art, New York, Solomon R. Guggenheim Museum, New York, Henry Art Museum, Seattle WA, and Neuberger Museum, Purchase, NY.

Awards
Civitella Ranieri Foundation, Umbertide, Italy (2009).
The Giverny Residency Program and Fellowship, Claude Monet Foundation, Giverny, France (2002).

References

1969 births
Living people
American women photographers
Artists from New York City
21st-century American women